Ella Gudrun Ingeborg Holleufer (March 22, 1906 – December 4, 1954) was married to the two time Prime Minister of Denmark, Hans Hedtoft.

She was born in Aarhus in Denmark as the daughter of the baker August Holleufer, and her mother Dorthea Marie was one of the leading suffragettes in Denmark at the end of the 19th century.

Ella Hedtoft died after suffering from Addison's disease for years and was buried at Vestre Kirkegård in Copenhagen, in a section where leading social democrats and members of the workers unions are buried.

References

Sources
 Leif Thorsen: Hans Hedtoft – En biografi. Odense Universitetsforlag 1998.
 The Holleufer Family (article written by journalist Torben Holleufer, Copenhagen, Denmark – son of Jørgen Holleufer, nephew of Hans & Ella Hedtoft).

1906 births
1954 deaths
Danish women
Deaths from Addison's disease
People from Aarhus
Spouses of prime ministers of Denmark